Alexeyevskaya is a rural locality (a village) in Plesetsky District, Arkhangelsk Oblast, Russia. The population was 25 as of 2010.

Geography 
Alexeyevskaya is located 113 km east of Plesetsk (the district's administrative centre) by road. Podvolochye is the nearest rural locality.

References 

Rural localities in Plesetsky District